The Case of the Stuttering Bishop is a 1937 drama film directed by William Clemens. It stars Donald Woods as Perry Mason and Ann Dvorak as Della Street, his secretary. Edward McWade plays the role of stuttering Bishop William Mallory. It is the sixth and final film in the Warner Bros. Perry Mason series. It is based on the novel The Case of the Stuttering Bishop (1936) by Erle Stanley Gardner.

Plot
Perry is asked by an Australian Bishop to take the case of a woman who was falsely accused of manslaughter 22 years ago. During his investigations Perry gets involved in another murder for which Ida, the woman he is supposed to free, gets arrested.

Cast
 Donald Woods as Perry Mason
 Ann Dvorak as Della Street
 Anne Nagel as Janice Alma Brownley
 Linda Perry as Janice Seaton
 Craig Reynolds as Gordon Bixler
 Gordon Oliver as Philip Brownley
 Joseph Crehan as Paul Drake
 Helen MacKellar as Stella Kenwood (as Helen McKellar)
 Edward McWade as Bishop William Mallory
 Tom Kennedy as Jim Magooney
 Mira McKinney as Ida Gilbert
 Frank Faylen as Charlie Downs
 Douglas Wood as Renald C. Brownley
 Veda Ann Borg as Gladys
 George Lloyd as Peter Sacks
 Selmer Jackson as Victor Stockton
 Charles Wilson as Hamilton Burger

Cultural references
In September 1937 Warner Bros. produced the Looney Tunes cartoon, The Case of the Stuttering Pig, featuring Porky Pig. Although a lawyer figures in the story, the cartoon has no relationship to the Warner Bros. Perry Mason feature that inspired its clever title.

Home media
On October 23, 2012, Warner Home Video released the film on DVD in Region 1 via their Warner Archive Collection alongside The Case of the Howling Dog, The Case of the Curious Bride, The Case of the Lucky Legs, The Case of the Velvet Claws and The Case of the Black Cat in a set entitled Perry Mason: The Original Warner Bros. Movies Collection. This is a manufacture-on-demand (MOD) release, available exclusively through Warner's online store and only in the US.

References

External links
 
 
 
 

1937 films
Warner Bros. films
Films based on American novels
Films based on mystery novels
American mystery films
Films directed by William Clemens
Perry Mason
American black-and-white films
1930s mystery films
1930s American films